Maye is an English surname variant of May. It is uncommon as a given name.  People with the surname include:

 Cory Maye (born 1980), American prisoner
 Drake Maye (born 2003), American football player
 Lee Maye (1934–2002), American baseball player and singer
 Luke Maye (born 1997), American basketball player
 Marcus Maye (born 1993), American football player
 Paul Maye (1913–1987), French cyclist
Marilyn Maye (born 1928), American jazz singer

Fictional
 Tiffany Maye, a university student and a dateable character in the dating simulation videogame HuniePop
 Jessie Maye, mother of Tiffany Maye and a dateable character in the dating simulation videogame HuniePop

See also
 May (surname)
 Mayes
 Mays (disambiguation)